Patrick Henry Middle School may refer to:

 Patrick Henry Middle School (Los Angeles, California), Granada Hills, California, part of the Los Angeles Unified School District
 [[Patrick Henry Middle School, Woodhaven-Brownstown School District, Detroit, Michigan
 Patrick Henry Middle School, Sioux Falls School District, Sioux Falls, South Dakota

See also 
 Patrick Henry High School (disambiguation)